The 2011 Men's Hockey Champions Trophy, officially known as the Owen G Glenn FIH Men's Champions Trophy, was the 33rd edition of the Champions Trophy men's field hockey tournament. The International Hockey Federation (FIH) confirmed India as the host country, and announced New Delhi as the host city on February 4, 2011. The tournament dates were December 3 to December 11, 2011. However, on September 6, 2011, the FIH announced that India would no longer host the tournament due to a governance issue, and announced Auckland, New Zealand as the new host on September 13, 2011 with the same time schedule. The tournament was held at North Harbour Hockey Stadium.

Australia won the title for the fourth consecutive and twelfth time total by defeating Spain 1–0 in the final.

Host city change
For the 33rd edition of the Hockey Champions Trophy, India was elected to host the tournament by the FIH on February 4, 2011. But due to an ongoing governance issue with the Indian Hockey Federation, the FIH announced that India would no longer host the competition, instead; Auckland, New Zealand hosted the tournament. New Zealand businessman Owen Glenn was instrumental in gaining the hosting rights for New Zealand. He funded Hockey New Zealand to gain the hosting rights.

The tournament was expected to have a television audience of approximately 38 million people. It being the largest hockey event in New Zealand's history. Auckland's mayor Len Brown said: "this event should inject around $1 million of new money into New Zealand's economy. The teams and officials directly involved in the event should generate over 4,000 visitor nights alone."

Qualification
The new qualification criteria were determined by International Hockey Federation (FIH), as follows:

  (2010 World Cup Champions)
  (2008 Olympics Champions and 2010 World Cup Runners-up)
  (Third in 2010 World Cup)
  (Fourth in 2010 World Cup as England)
  (Fifth in 2010 World Cup)
  (Invitational)
  (Invitational)
  (Host nation)

Results
All times are New Zealand Daylight Time (UTC+13:00)

First round

Pool A

Pool B

Second round

Pool C

Pool D

Classification

Seventh and eighth place

Fifth and sixth place

Third and fourth place

Final

Awards

Statistics

Final standings

Goalscorers

References

External links
Official FIH website

Champions Trophy (field hockey)
Champions Trophy
International field hockey competitions hosted by New Zealand
Hockey Champions Trophy 2011
Sports competitions in Auckland
2010s in Auckland
December 2011 sports events in New Zealand